Nursery Cryme is the third studio album by the English rock band Genesis, released in November 1971 on Charisma Records. It was their first to feature drummer/vocalist Phil Collins and guitarist Steve Hackett. The album received a mixed response from critics and was not initially a commercial success; it did not enter the UK chart until 1974, when it reached its peak at No. 39. However, the album was successful in Continental Europe, particularly Italy. At approximately 39 minutes long, it is the shortest studio album by the band to date.

Following extensive touring in support of their previous album Trespass (1970), which included the recruitment of Collins and Hackett, the band began writing and rehearsing for a follow-up in Luxford House, East Sussex, with recording following at Trident Studios. Nursery Cryme saw the band take a more aggressive direction of some songs, with substantially improved drumming. The opening piece, "The Musical Box" combined the band's trademark mix of twelve-string guitars with harsh electric guitars and keyboards. The song, a macabre fairy story set in Victorian Britain, became the inspiration for the album cover, and went on to be a live favourite. Collins brought a new dimension to the group, covering the majority of the backing vocals (including his first lead vocal with Genesis on "For Absent Friends") and bringing in a sense of humour on tracks like "Harold The Barrel". At Hackett's suggestion, Banks made more prominent use of the Mellotron on several tracks.

The band toured the UK and Europe for one year to promote the album, which raised their profile in both territories. The tour included a successful Italian leg in April 1972, where the group played to enthusiastic crowds. Nursery Cryme was certified Silver by the British Phonographic Industry in 2013. Ever since 1971, there have been many re-releases of Nursery Cryme.

Background

Genesis recorded their first album as a professional outfit, Trespass in June 1970, but immediately afterwards, founding member and guitarist Anthony Phillips quit owing to increased stress and unhappiness in touring. The other founders, singer Peter Gabriel, keyboardist Tony Banks and bassist/guitarist Mike Rutherford almost split up the group, but decided to carry on and replace drummer John Mayhew with someone who was of equal stature to the others and who could write.

Phil Collins joined as the new drummer in August, also becoming an important backing vocalist, but they were unable to find a suitable replacement for Phillips. This led to the group completing the first half of their 1970–1971 tour as a four-piece with Rutherford playing rhythm guitar and bass pedals and Banks playing lead guitar lines on a Pianet through a distorted fuzz box amplifier in addition to his own keyboard parts. Banks credited this to improving his technique as it required him to play two keyboards simultaneously. The group felt that Collins was the best drummer they had worked with at that point, and his playing style and musical tastes gave a new dimension to their sound. Some songs were not practical to play live as a four-piece, so they decided to look again for a lead guitarist. In November 1970, Mick Barnard joined the group on recommendation from Friars Aylesbury's David Stopps, and "The Musical Box" was added to the live set. However, the rest of the group quickly realised that Barnard was not up to the same standard as the others, and they kept a look out for a better player.

Genesis recruited Steve Hackett after Gabriel spotted an advert he placed in Melody Maker in December 1970, which read "Imaginative guitarist/writer seeks involvement with receptive musicians, determined to drive beyond existing stagnant music forms". He saw Genesis play a concert at the Lyceum Theatre, London on 28 December, and was told by Gabriel that Barnard would have to be replaced. Hackett quickly developed a rapport with Rutherford, sharing their love of twelve-string guitars and new musical ideas, and joined the band in early 1971.

With the addition of Hackett, Genesis continued touring which included the "Six Bob Tour" with their Charisma Records labelmates Lindisfarne and Van der Graaf Generator, their first overseas shows which occurred in Belgium and the first of three appearances at the annual Reading Festival. Early attempts to work on material for their next studio album in what Hackett described as "the odd day in a windy church hall" while on tour were unproductive, causing the group to dedicate time. In July, they began a three-month break from touring to write and record which was Hackett's first experience of rehearsing with a group to a professional standard.

The five moved to Charisma owner Tony Stratton-Smith's residence, Luxford House, a 16th-century Grade II listed building in Crowborough, East Sussex. The group nicknamed the house "Toad Hall". Genesis were apprehensive about writing without Phillips, and both Collins and Hackett were unsure of what level of musical contributions they would be able to make. Hackett was keen to explore new sounds and musical ideas, and suggested the group buy a Mellotron, which Banks used as his main instrument, along with the Hammond organ, instead of the piano. Some material had been written when Phillips and Mayhew were still in the band, and were reworked by the new members. Collins was a particular workaholic and was happy to jam with anyone at any time.

Recording
With the new material worked out, Genesis recorded Nursery Cryme at Trident Studios in London in August 1971 with John Anthony as their producer and David Hentschel their assistant engineer who, like Anthony, had worked the same role on Trespass. The album features Hackett playing a Les Paul guitar which the band had bought him along with a Hiwatt stack amplifier. He recalled some difficulty in understanding what Banks and Rutherford were talking about as the two had devised their own sayings, for instance a passage that they had played was referred to as a "nice guy".

Songs

"The Musical Box"
"The Musical Box" was a lengthy piece that described a macabre story placed in Victorian Britain. A young boy, Henry, is accidentally decapitated by his friend Cynthia while playing croquet. Returning to the house, Cynthia plays Henry's old musical box, which unleashes the spirit of Henry as an old man. Henry has become sexually frustrated and attempts to seduce Cynthia. The nurse enters the room, hurls the musical box at the wall, destroying both it and Henry.

The song originated when Phillips was in the group, who would often write with Rutherford on 12-string acoustic guitars. The latter had begun to experiment with unorthodox guitar tunings and had the top three strings tuned into F sharp which provided the jangly sound heard in the opening and the chord that signalled the start of the electric guitar solo. The tuning influenced the title of an acoustic piece, "F#" (pronounced "F sharp") that became the basis of "The Musical Box", which was developed further after Phillips's departure. The opening section of the song features both Rutherford and Banks on twelve-string. An earlier version of the song, entitled "Manipulation", was performed with Phillips in 1970 for the soundtrack of an unreleased BBC documentary on painter Michael Jackson.

The guitar solos originated from Barnard's brief tenure in Genesis. Hackett modified sections that Phillips and Barnard had written while adding his own arrangements to the song. He realised that neither member had made a sound that resembled an actual musical box, so he took the opportunity to record a guitar lick that is heard before the lyric "Here it comes again". Gabriel, a big fan of The Who at the time, pushed for Rutherford to come up with a "ballsy, attacking" section in a similar style to their guitarist Pete Townshend. Gabriel incorporated themes of violence and sex into the lyrics. Collins was inspired to play a rolling drum part during the middle section from hearing "The Weaver's Answer" by Family, and put it to the rhythm. "All of a sudden", speaking about "The Musical Box" at this point, "It's 'wahey we're off!'".

The song became a live favourite during Gabriel's tenure with the band. He first decided on the idea of wearing costumes at a gig in the National Stadium, Dublin in September 1972, leaving during the instrumental break and re-appearing at the conclusion wearing his wife's red dress and a fox's head. Later, he would wear an "old man" mask for the song's ending, acting out the part of the aged Henry.

Other songs

"For Absent Friends" is an acoustic song that marked Hackett's first significant writing contribution for the group, and the first Genesis song with Collins on lead vocals. After coming up with the music himself and the lyrics with Collins, Hackett recalled being shy when he presented it to Gabriel as they were the new members of the group. Hackett was inspired by "Eleanor Rigby" by the Beatles to write a straightforward song about a relationship, to which Collins suggested one about two old women who had lost their husbands.

"The Return of the Giant Hogweed" warns of the spread of the toxic plant Heracleum mantegazzianum after it was "captured" in Russia and brought to England by a Victorian explorer. Though the real plant is extremely toxic and dangerous, the song's lyrics are a humorous exaggeration, suggesting the plant is attempting to take over the human race. Both "The Musical Box" and "The Return of the Giant Hogweed" feature Hackett's first use of guitar tapping, a technique whereby the index finger of the plucking hand is applied directly to the guitar fret board. The opening to the latter features Hackett and Banks playing triplets in harmony.

"Seven Stones" was conceived by Banks who used what Rutherford described as "his big, schmaltzy, music hall chords [that] he loved." Melody Maker reporter Chris Welch described the song as "strangely mournful and inconclusive." He theorised that the old man addressed in the lyric is expressing his "profound belief that the secret of success and good fortune is based purely on random events and chance."

"Harold the Barrel" showed a humorous side to Genesis, which was encouraged by Collins. The lyrics show black humour of a man contemplating suicide by jumping off a building, with wordplay influenced by John Lennon's In His Own Write. The track was recorded with Gabriel and Collins singing the song as a duet. Their vocals were mixed onto the same audio track so they cannot be separated.

"Harlequin" was written by Rutherford. He played two separate guitar parts on a single 12-string which he thought produced "pretty dodgy" results, and was also critical of his lyrics.

"The Fountain of Salmacis" tells the Greek myth of Salmacis and Hermaphroditus. It originated from a short rundown passage that Banks had come up with while at university. An earlier version of the track, entitled "Provocation", was recorded in 1970 for the soundtrack of an unreleased BBC documentary on painter Michael Jackson.  The track makes use of the Mellotron, with an influence from King Crimson's In the Court of the Crimson King. Banks thought the instrument greatly complemented his piece when combined with the organ. It became the basis for "The Fountain of Salmacis" which was taken further to a complete song as the result of group jams. Hackett particularly enjoyed the time he came up with his ending guitar solo, which occurred around midnight at Luxford House during a rare moment when the group were up for recording.

Cover
The album's sleeve was designed and illustrated by Paul Whitehead who had also designed the cover for Trespass and the band's next album, Foxtrot. The cover depicts characters and scenes based on "The Musical Box" and Coxhill, the manor house with a croquet lawn, itself based on the Victorian home Gabriel grew up in. When the group originally saw Whitehead's painting, they said it didn't look old enough, so he varnished it with honey which made it look like it was an antique from the 19th century. When originally released, the cover shocked some people, because of the severed heads pictured on it.

The inner sleeve resembled an old photo album, with a panel for each song along with an illustrated picture. Whitehead later picked his design for Nursery Cryme as his favourite of the three done for Genesis, noting: "It just works very well with the music. It fits perfect. It's the right colour, the right vibe".

Whitehead's original illustrations for the three albums were stolen from the Charisma archives when it was sold to Virgin Records in 1983. Whitehead claimed that Charisma staff got wind of the imminent sale and proceeded to loot its office.

Release
Nursery Cryme was released in November 1971. Charisma promoted the album less than Trespass since the company was busy with Lindisfarne's Fog on the Tyne. The group felt discouraged by the general indifference from the record company, and believed songs like "The Musical Box" could have been as popular as "Stairway to Heaven", released at the same time.

Though the group still had a minor cult following at home, they started to achieve commercial and critical success in mainland Europe, with the album reaching No. 4 on the Italian charts. The album continued to sell, and reached Silver certification by the British Phonographic Industry on 22 July 2013 for sales in excess of 60,000 copies.

From November 1971 to August 1972, Genesis toured to support the album which included further visits to Belgium, and Italy for the first time where they played to enthusiastic crowds. During the tour Genesis recorded "Happy the Man", a non-album single, with "Seven Stones" from Nursery Cryme on its B-side. The group played a thirty-minute set on Belgian television to promote the album, which is the earliest surviving full broadcast of the group and has been repeated numerous times. Gabriel had yet to develop his on-stage costume attire and performed the show in a more straightforward frontman role. It has been one of Genesis' most popular bootlegs.

Critical reception

Critical response to the album was mixed. Richard Cromelin of Rolling Stone summarised that its "main problem lies not in Genesis' concepts, which are, if nothing else, outrageously imaginative and lovably eccentric, nor with their musical structures—long, involved, multi-movemented frameworks on which they hang their narratives—nor even with their playing, which does get pretty lethargic at points. It's the godawful production, a murky, distant stew that at best bubbles quietly when what is desperately needed are the explosions of drums and guitars, the screaming of the organ, the abrasive rasp of vocal cords." He nonetheless remarked positively on some of the songs, and noted that he saw promise in the band. In a full page advert published in Melody Maker, keyboardist Keith Emerson wrote a positive summary: "This is not the start for Genesis neither is it the end. No bullshit: Their new album really is incredible". Village Voice critic Robert Christgau was less enthusiastic in a review compiled for Christgau's Record Guide: Rock Albums of the Seventies (1981). Writing in sarcastic exclamations, he said of the record: "God's wounds! It's a 'rock' version of the myth of Hermaphroditus! In quotes cos the organist and the (mime-influenced) vocalist have the drummer a little confused! Or maybe it's just the invocation to Old King Cole!"

Retrospective appraisals have been mildly positive. BBC Music praised the two new members of the band as fundamental to Genesis's artistic success, remarking "Collins' snappy drums were augmented by his uncanny ability to sound not unlike Gabriel ... Hackett's armoury of tapping and swell techniques really broadened the palette of the band, giving Tony Banks more room for his Delius-lite organ filigrees, not to mention their newly purchased Mellotron", and gushed that "Genesis had virtually invented their own genre, Edwardian rock". Although Stephen Thomas Erlewine of AllMusic deemed the album highly uneven, he considered "The Musical Box" and "The Return of the Giant Hogweed" to be "genuine masterpieces", and concluded that even if the rest of the album "isn't quite as compelling or quite as structured, it doesn't quite matter because these are the songs that showed what Genesis could do, and they still stand as pinnacles of what the band could achieve". Geddy Lee of Rush included this album among his favourites in a list from an interview with The Quietus.

Track listing
All songs credited to Genesis. Actual songwriters listed below.

Personnel
Credits are adapted from the album's 1971 and 2007 liner notes.

Genesis
Tony Banks – Hammond organ,  Mellotron, piano, electric piano, 12-string guitar, backing vocals
Mike Rutherford – bass, bass pedals, 12-string guitar, backing vocals
Peter Gabriel – lead voice, flute, oboe, bass drum, tambourine
Steve Hackett – electric guitar, 12-string guitar
Phil Collins – drums, voices, percussion, lead vocals on "For Absent Friends", co-lead vocals on "Harold the Barrel" and "Harlequin" (uncredited)

Production
John Anthony – production
David Hentschel – engineer
Mike Stone – tape jockey
Paul Whitehead – sleeve design

Charts

Certifications

References

Notes

Citations

Books

DVD media

External links
 
 

1971 albums
Genesis (band) albums
Virgin Records albums
Atlantic Records albums
Charisma Records albums
Albums produced by John Anthony (record producer)
Albums recorded at Trident Studios